Ronald B. Ramsey Sr. (born August 14, 1959) is an American politician. He was a member of the Georgia State Senate representing the 43rd District, serving from 2007 to July 2015. Ramsey resigned his Senate seat following his appointment by Georgia Governor Nathan Deal to become a judge serving the Traffic Division of DeKalb State Court in DeKalb County. He is a member of the Democratic party.

References

1959 births
Place of birth missing (living people)
Living people
Georgia (U.S. state) state court judges
Democratic Party Georgia (U.S. state) state senators
People from DeKalb County, Georgia
21st-century American politicians
Atlanta's John Marshall Law School alumni